Ian Otieno (born 9 August 1993) is a Kenyan international footballer who plays for ZESCO United as a goalkeeper.

Career
Born in Siaya, Otieno has played club football for Posta Rangers, A.F.C. Leopards, Red Arrows and ZESCO United. Otieno signed for ZESCO United in January 2020 on a three-year contract.

He made his international debut for Kenya in 2015.

References

1993 births
Living people
Kenyan footballers
Association football goalkeepers
Posta Rangers F.C. players
A.F.C. Leopards players
Red Arrows F.C. players
ZESCO United F.C. players
Kenyan Premier League players
Kenya international footballers
Kenyan expatriate footballers
Kenyan expatriate sportspeople in Zambia
Expatriate footballers in Zambia